Arvo Niitenberg (27 September 1934 Tallinn – 16 July 2003) is an Estonian technical scientist, politician and diplomat. From 1992 until 1995, he was Minister of Energy.

References

1934 births
2003 deaths
Estonian scientists
Estonian politicians
Estonian diplomats
Government ministers of Estonia
University of Toronto alumni
Recipients of the Order of the National Coat of Arms, 3rd Class
Estonian World War II refugees
Estonian emigrants to Canada
Politicians from Tallinn